The Palais omnisport Les Arènes, often abbreviated as Les Arènes, is an indoor sports arena in Metz, France. It is the home venue of the Metz Handball team and the Open de Moselle men's tennis tournament, part of the ATP Tour 250 series of the ATP Tour. Currently the arena has a capacity of 4,500 seats.

See also
 List of tennis stadiums by capacity

External links 
 

Indoor arenas in France
Tennis venues in France
Handball venues in France
Buildings and structures in Metz
Sports venues completed in 2001
Sports venues in Moselle (department)
2002 establishments in France
21st-century architecture in France